Roofed Bazaar of Nishapur (Persian:  بازار سرپوش نیشابور)  is a historical roofed Bazaar dating back to the Safavid Persia in Nishapur, Razavi Khorasan province of Iran. Many of its parts have been unfortunately destroyed and only 750 meters of it remain. There is a current effort made by the MCHT to reconstruct and repair this bazaar. This bazaar is located on the Imam Khomeini street of Nishapur. Its reconstruction was started in the year 1998. This Bazaar is now part of the national heritage list of Iran with the registration number of 6739.

Gallery

See also 

 Greater Khorasan
 Nishapur

References 

Buildings and structures in Nishapur
Tourist attractions in Razavi Khorasan Province
Infobox mapframe without OSM relation ID on Wikidata
Nishapur
Khorasan
Bazaars